Nam Mae Kham Mi is a watercourse in Thailand. It is a tributary of the Yom River, part of the Chao Phraya River basin.

Kham Mi